Rick Leach and Scott Melville were the defending champions but did not compete that year.

Byron Black and Grant Connell won in the final 6–4, 6–4 against Jonas Björkman and Nicklas Kulti.

Seeds
Champion seeds are indicated in bold text while text in italics indicates the round in which those seeds were eliminated. The top four seeded teams received byes into the second round.

Draw

Final

Top half

Bottom half

External links
 1996 Pilot Pen International Doubles draw

1996 Pilot Pen International